Indrajith Sukumaran (born 17 December 1979) is an Indian actor and singer. He predominantly works in Malayalam cinema. Indrajith was born to the actors Sukumaran and Mallika Sukumaran and is the elder brother of Prithviraj Sukumaran.

Indrajith made his acting debut in the 1986 film Padayani as a child artist, and has gone on to star in more than 80 films, notably Meesa Madhavan (2002), Runway (2004), Vesham (2004), Classmates (2006), Chotta Mumbai (2007), Arabikkatha (2007), Twenty:20 (2008), Nayakan (2010), Karayilekku Oru Kadal Dooram (2010), Ee Adutha Kaalathu (2012), Amen (2013), Left Right Left (2013), Ezhamathe Varavu (2013), Angels (2014), Amar Akbar Anthony (2015), Virus (2019), Lucifer (2019), Halal Love Story (2020) and Kurup (2021).

Indrajith has also starred in a few  Tamil, English, Telugu and Hindi films, such as En Mana Vaanil (2002), Before the Rains (2007), Sarvam (2009), Kavya's Diary (2009), and The Waiting Room (2010).

Early life and family

Indrajith was born as the elder son of actors Sukumaran and Mallika Sukumaran on 17 December 1979. His brother Prithviraj Sukumaran is also a well-known actor in south Indian cinema.

Indrajith's initial schooling was at Shrine Vailankanni Senior Secondary School, T. Nagar, Chennai and St. Joseph's Boys School, Coonoor, since the family was settled at Tamil Nadu at that time. Later, when the family shifted to Kerala, he had his education from The NSS Public School Perunthanni, St. Mary's Residential Central School, Poojappura. He completed the rest of his school education at Sainik School Kazhakoottam, along with his brother Prithviraj. He was the captain of Tennis team while studying there. He also participated in music and acting competitions. He pursued his bachelor's with distinction in Computer science engineering from Rajaas Engineering College in Tirunelveli district and was working as a trainee in a software company when he entered into the film career. Later, he dropped his job and became busy with movies.

Acting career

He started his career in malayalam movie as a child artist in "Padayani" in 1986. He was noted for his villain role Eappen Pappachi in the blockbuster Meesa Madhavan, directed by Lal Jose.

He acted alongside Mohanlal in Anwar Rasheed's Chotta Mumbai and Shaji Kailas's Baba Kalyani. His performance as the villain in Baba Kalyani was acclaimed by critics. He acted with Mammootty in the movie Vesham

He also acted in Lal Jose's film Arabikkatha and Santhosh Sivan's Before the Rains. He paired with his brother Prithviraj Sukumaran in several films, including the 2006's hit film Classmates. He starred in the lead role with Vineeth in Hariharan's Film Ezhamathe Varavu, written by M. T. Vasudevan Nair after the success of Pazhassi Raja (2009).

His debut Hindi film The Waiting Room, directed by Maneej Premnath was released in January 2010.

Personal life

On 13 December 2002, he married actress Poornima Mohan. They have two daughters.

Awards

 2013 - TTK Prestige-Vanitha Film Awards - Best Supporting Actor - Amen
Asiavision Awards 
 2013 - Asiavision Awards - Outstanding Performance of the Year

Filmography

As actor 
All films are in Malayalam language unless otherwise noted.

As Voice over

Tele film and Web series

As actor

Discography

As singer

References

External links
 
 
 Indrajith at MSI
 
 Official website of Information and Public Relation Department of Kerala
 Indrajith's movies in Malayalam Movies

Indian male film actors
Living people
Male actors from Thiruvananthapuram
Male actors in Malayalam cinema
Sainik School alumni
1979 births
Indian male child actors
20th-century Indian male actors
21st-century Indian male actors
Male actors in Tamil cinema
Male actors in Hindi cinema
Male actors in Telugu cinema
Indian male playback singers
Malayalam playback singers
Singers from Thiruvananthapuram
Indian Hindus